Ontario Series Lacrosse, known as the OLA Senior B Lacrosse League from 1999-2019, is a Senior box lacrosse league based out of Ontario, Canada sanctioned by the Ontario Lacrosse Association. Many of the players in the league play or have played in the National Lacrosse League. OSL winners earn a chance at the national championship—the Presidents Cup.

History

The league was formed in late 1999 with play beginning in 2000. Founding members of the league were the Arthur Aces, Brooklin Merchants and St. Clair Storm. Burlington Chiefs, Owen Sound Woodsmen and Six Nations Crash and were accepted for the 2001 season.

The Ennismore Shamrocks were added for the 2002 season while the Six Nations Crash changed their named to the Six Nations Mohawk Stars.

The league expanded again for 2003 with the Ajax-Pickering Rock and Kitchener-Waterloo Kodiaks. The loss of the Burlington franchise for the 2004 season was offset by the addition of the Barrie Sr. Lakeshores.

Barrie won the league championship in their inaugural season and immediately moved to Major Series Lacrosse in 2005.

At the beginning of the 2006 season, the Kitchener-Waterloo Kodiaks purchased the St. Catharines Athletics MSL team, leaving the Senior B league at seven teams. Also in 2006, the Arthur Aces were renamed the Wellington Aces.

Prior to the start of the 2007 season, the St. Clair Storm announced that they were folding. The Ennismore Shamrocks changed ownership and became the Norwood Nitro, the first of three name changes to come.

In 2009, the Owen Sound Woodsmen became the first team in league history to win back-to-back Presidents Cups championships. In 2010, the Woodsmen would win their fourth-consecutive and seventh overall league title, both league records.

At the beginning of the 2010 season the Nitro changed their name to Norwood Champs, then Ennismore James Gang in 2013. Huntsville Hawks were added as a new franchise for the 2010 season.

St. Catharines Saints joined the league for the 2011 season and won the 2013 Presidents Cup in just their third season.

Sarnia Beavers joined in 2012 and the Six Nations Rivermen in 2013. Sarnia relocated as the Wallaceburg Thrashers for 2015.

After hosting the Presidents Cup in 2015, the St. Catharines Saints ceased operations.

In March 2016 the OSBLL announced expansion into Waterloo, Ontario, as the MSL's Kitchener-Waterloo Kodiaks had relocated to Cobourg, Ontario.

In 2019, the league rebranded as Ontario Series Lacrosse.

Teams

Former teams 
Ajax-Pickering Rock (2003-2010)
Oakville Titans (2006 - 2021)
Arthur/Wellington Aces/Wellington-Dufferin Titans (became Oakville Titans in 2013)
Barrie Sr. Lakeshores (2004)
Burlington Sr. Chiefs (2001-2003)
Ennismore Shamrocks/Norwood Nitro/Norwood Champs (became Ennnismore James Gang in 2013)
Huntsville Hawks (2010-2012)
Kitchener-Waterloo Kodiaks (2003-2006)
Kitchener-Waterloo Velocity (2017-2019)
Sarnia Beavers/Wallaceburg Thrashers (2012-2015)
Six Nations Crash/Mohawk Stars/Ohsweken Warriors (2001-2011)
St. Catharines Saints (2011-2015)
St. Clair Storm (2001-2006)

Clare Levack Memorial Trophy Champions

Champion moves on to the Presidents Cup national championship.

Presidents Cup winners

References

External links
OLA Senior B website
OLA Official website

Ontario Lacrosse Association
Lacrosse leagues in Canada
1999 establishments in Ontario
Sports leagues established in 1999